Derval is a commune in the Loire-Atlantique department in western France.

Geography
The river Chère forms all of the commune's northern border.

Population

International relations
Derval is twinned with Llanidloes, a small town in Wales.

See also
Communes of the Loire-Atlantique department

References

Communes of Loire-Atlantique
Loire-Atlantique communes articles needing translation from French Wikipedia